The 2021 ICC Men's T20 World Cup was the seventh ICC Men's T20 World Cup tournament, with the matches played in the United Arab Emirates and Oman from 17 October to 14 November 2021. The West Indies were the defending champions, but were eventually eliminated in the Super 12 stage.

Originally the event was scheduled to be held in Australia from 18 October to 15 November 2020, but in July 2020, the International Cricket Council (ICC) confirmed that this tournament had been postponed, due to the COVID-19 pandemic. In August 2020, the ICC confirmed that India would host the 2021 tournament as planned, with Australia being named as the host for the succeeding 2022 tournament. However, in June 2021, the ICC announced that the tournament had been moved to the United Arab Emirates due to growing concerns over the COVID-19 pandemic situation in India, and a possible third wave of the pandemic in the country due to the fears of Delta variant. The tournament began on 17 October 2021, with the tournament's final taking place on 14 November 2021. The preliminary rounds of the tournament were played in the UAE and Oman.

New Zealand became the first team to reach the final, after they beat England by five wickets in the semi-finals. It was the first time that New Zealand had qualified for a T20 World Cup final. They were joined in the final by Australia, who beat Pakistan by five wickets in the second semi-final. It was the second time that Australia had qualified for the final of the T20 World Cup, after reaching the final of the 2010 tournament. In the final, Australia beat New Zealand by eight wickets to win their first T20 World Cup. Mitchell Marsh was named the Player of the Match, with David Warner being named the Player of the Tournament.

Background 
In April 2020, the ICC confirmed that despite the COVID-19 pandemic, the tournament was still planned to go ahead as scheduled. However, the following month a senior ICC official said that it would be "too big a risk" to host the tournament in 2020, The ICC also stated that reports of postponing the tournament were inaccurate, with multiple contingency plans being looked at. A decision on the tournament was originally deferred until the ICC's meeting on 10 June 2020, with a further announcement scheduled to be made in July 2020. In June 2020, Earl Eddings, the chairman of Cricket Australia, said that it was "unlikely" and "unrealistic" that the tournament would take place in Australia as scheduled. Eddings also suggested that Australia could host the event in October 2021, and India stage the tournament a year later in 2022. The ICC also considered moving the tournament to be played around the next Women's ODI World Cup, which was originally scheduled to take place in New Zealand for February 2021.

A month before the official postponement, Australian federal tourism minister Simon Birmingham announced that the Australian government expected that the country's borders would be closed to international travel until 2021. The ICC also confirmed that either Australia or India, the hosts for the tournaments originally scheduled to take place in 2020 and 2021 respectively, would host this tournament. In August 2020, the ICC confirmed that India are expected to host the 2021 tournament, with Australia expected to the 2022 tournament. In the same month, the ICC confirmed that Sri Lanka and the United Arab Emirates were being considered as back-up venues for the tournament. In April 2021, the ICC's CEO Geoff Allardice confirmed that back-up plans were still in place if India were unable to host the tournament due to the pandemic. Later the same month, Dhiraj Malhotra of the Board of Control for Cricket in India (BCCI) confirmed that the UAE would be used as a contingency, if the pandemic in India continued to get worse. The BCCI were also in talks with Oman as a potential co-host of the tournament. On 1 June 2021, the ICC gave the BCCI the deadline of 28 June 2021 to make its decision on where the tournament would be played. Regardless of the actual location of the tournament, the ICC also confirmed that the BCCI would remain as the hosts of the competition. Later, the ICC confirmed that the tournament had been moved to the UAE and Oman. It was the first time for both the UAE and Oman to be hosting a global ICC event, and also the first occasion that a cricket World Cup was being held entirely outside of the Test-playing nations.

Less than two weeks before the start of the tournament, Oman was impacted by Cyclone Shaheen which passed only a few miles north of the tournament venue in Al-Amerat. Pankaj Khimji, chairman of Oman Cricket, stated that "we were so close to being virtually wiped out [...] had this had happened over here in this area, I'd have said goodbye to the World Cup".

Teams and qualification 

As of 31 December 2018, the top nine ranked ICC Full Members, alongside hosts India, qualified directly for the 2021 tournament. Of those ten teams, the top eight ranked sides qualified for the Super 12s stage of the tournament. Sri Lanka and Bangladesh did not qualify for the Super 12s, instead being placed in the group stage of the competition. They were joined by the six teams who had qualified for the tournament via the 2019 ICC T20 World Cup Qualifier. Of the teams in the ICC Men's T20I Team Rankings, the United Arab Emirates and Nepal could only qualify through regional competitions. The top four teams from the group stage advanced to the Super 12s.

Papua New Guinea were the first team to secure their position via the Qualifier, after they won Group A of the tournament, finishing above the Netherlands on net run rate. It was the first time that Papua New Guinea had qualified for a World Cup in any format. Ireland became the second team to qualify via this route after they won Group B, also on net run rate.

In the first match in the playoffs, the Netherlands qualified for the T20 World Cup when they beat the United Arab Emirates by eight wickets, after the UAE only scored 80 runs in their innings. The second qualifier match saw Namibia advance to their first T20 World Cup after beating Oman by 54 runs. Scotland beat tournament hosts the United Arab Emirates in the third qualifier by 90 runs to secure their place in the T20 World Cup. Oman became the final team to qualify for the T20 World Cup, when they beat Hong Kong by 12 runs in the last playoff match.

In August 2021, concerns and doubts were raised over the participation of Afghanistan cricket team in the tournament ever since Afghanistan was brought under the control of the Taliban. Afghanistan's team media manager Hikmat Hassan confirmed that Afghanistan would play in the T20 World Cup, despite the political turmoil in the country. On 6 October 2021, the Afghanistan team left Kabul, travelling to Doha, Qatar, for a training camp before the start of the tournament.

Match officials 
On 7 October 2021, the ICC named the match referees and the on-field umpires for the tournament. For the Super 12 match between India and New Zealand, umpire Michael Gough was replaced by Marais Erasmus after Gough was suspended for six days for breaching the tournament's bio-secure bubble. On 3 November 2021, the ICC confirmed that Gough would not officiate in any further matches in the tournament. On 9 November 2021, the match officials were confirmed for the semi-final matches, with the officials for the final being confirmed on 12 November 2021.

Match referees
  David Boon
  Jeff Crowe
  Ranjan Madugalle
  Javagal Srinath

Umpires

  Chris Brown
  Aleem Dar
  Kumar Dharmasena
  Marais Erasmus
  Chris Gaffaney
  Michael Gough
  Adrian Holdstock
  Richard Illingworth
  Richard Kettleborough
  Nitin Menon
  Ahsan Raza
  Paul Reiffel
  Langton Rusere
  Rod Tucker
  Joel Wilson
  Paul Wilson

Squads 

Each team selected a squad of 15 players before 10 October 2021. Each team was also able to select up to seven additional players, if needed, with regards to COVID-19. On 10 August 2021, New Zealand were the first team to announce their squad for the tournament. All the teams announced their preliminary squads by 12 September 2021.

Schedule and broadcasting 
With a total of 45 matches, the T20 World Cup was composed of two rounds. Round 1 had twelve matches played between eight teams (Bangladesh, Sri Lanka, Ireland, Netherlands, Scotland, Namibia, Oman and Papua New Guinea), with the top four teams progressing to the Super 12s. The Super 12s consisted of 30 matches between the four teams from Round 1 and the top eight ranked T20I teams. Originally, if Sri Lanka or Bangladesh qualified from their first round groups, they would have retained their respective seedings of A1 or B1 for the Super 12s. However, the ICC later changed this rule, after Scotland topped Group B and progressed as B1. Those teams were then split into two groups of six each. This was then followed by the two semi-finals and then the final. On 16 July 2021, the ICC confirmed the groups for the tournament, which were decided on the rankings of the teams as of 20 March 2021. On 17 August 2021, the ICC confirmed the final fixtures for the tournament including the first round and super 12 matches.

The ICC named all of the official broadcasters for the tournament on its website, including details on television coverage, digital content for in-match clips and highlights, and audio listings. The official anthem of the tournament was released on 14 October 2021, by Sony Music India.

Venues 
On 17 April 2021, the BCCI proposed the name of the cities which are scheduled to be hosting the matches. Bangalore, Chennai, Dharamshala, Hyderabad, Kolkata, Lucknow, Mumbai, and New Delhi were the venues along with Ahmedabad, hosting the final of the event. On 18 April 2021, it was announced that Pakistan would play two of their group matches in Delhi, while Mumbai and Kolkata would host the semi-finals. On 28 June 2021, BCCI President Sourav Ganguly confirmed that due to the COVID-19 situation in the country the board has officially communicated to the ICC about their decision to move the event from India to the UAE. Some of the preliminary round matches of the event were also set to be held in Oman. On 29 June 2021, the ICC confirmed that the T20 World Cup would be played in the UAE and Oman. The tournament took place in four venues: the Dubai International Cricket Stadium, the Sheikh Zayed Cricket Stadium, the Sharjah Cricket Stadium, and the Oman Cricket Academy Ground. During July 2021, the Tolerance Oval in Abu Dhabi was awaiting accreditation by the ICC to also be used as one of the venues for the tournament.

Prize money 
On 10 October 2021, the ICC announced the prize money for the tournament.

Warm-up matches 

The following warm-up matches for the 2021 ICC Men's T20 World Cup were played between 12 and 20 October between all participants. The first set of matches featured the teams from the groups in the first round of the main tournament, before the teams in the Super 12 phase played their warm-up matches. These matches did not have either Twenty20 International (T20I) status or T20 status as teams were allowed to field all 15 members of their squad.

First round warm-ups

Super 12 warm-ups

First round

Group A

Group B

Super 12

Group 1

Group 2

Knockout stage

Semi-finals

Final

Statistics 
The leading run-scorer in the tournament was Babar Azam, with 303. The leading wicket-taker was Wanindu Hasaranga, who took 16 dismissals, the most by a bowler in a single edition of the T20 World Cup.

Most runs

Most wickets

Team of the tournament 
On 14 November 2021, the ICC announced its team of the tournament, with David Warner being named as player of the tournament and Babar Azam as the captain of the team.

Notes

References

External links 
 Series home at ESPN Cricinfo

2021
2021 in cricket
2021 in Emirati cricket
2021 in Omani sport
 
International cricket competitions in 2021–22
ICC Men's T20 World Cup 2021
International cricket competitions in the United Arab Emirates
International cricket competitions in Oman
ICC Men's T20 World Cup
ICC Men's T20 World Cup